"That Don't Satisfy Me" is a song by American hard rock band Brother Cane, appearing on the band's self-titled debut. The song was released as the second single from the album in late 1993. "That Don't Satisfy Me" was the band's second straight top 10 Mainstream Rock single, peaking at #6 on the chart for the week of December 11, 1993.

The single features an acoustic version of the band's previous single "Got No Shame" as a b-side.

Track listing

Personnel
Brother Cane
Damon Johnson – lead vocals, lead guitar
Roman Glick – rhythm guitar, backing vocals
Glenn Maxey – bass guitar
Scott Collier – drums, percussion

Additional musicians
Susan Snedecor – backing vocals
Chuck Leveall – piano

Chart positions

References

1993 songs
1993 singles
Brother Cane songs
Virgin Records singles
Songs written by Damon Johnson